David "Hoss" Wright is an American drummer who has played for The Exies, and Nick Oliveri and the Mondo Generator. While part of Mondo Generator, he wrote some songs for the album Dead Planet with Nick Oliveri. His musical career began around the time he was 13 in Richmond, Virginia. He was a member of the local band Black Widow and he was the drummer of the band "JUD" based in Los Angeles. Currently working with Los Angeles based songwriter Richard James Munoz for new album release in 2017.

Discography
The Exies
 A Modern Way of Living with the Truth

 Nick Oliveri and the Mondo Generator
 Dead Planet
 Hell Comes To Your Heart

References

Living people
Year of birth missing (living people)
Musicians from Richmond, Virginia
American rock drummers
Mondo Generator members
The Exies members